aka  (born September 20, 1911, date of death unknown) was a Japanese film director, known for his pioneering work in the pink film genre. Among the accomplishments of Seki's career: he directed the first pink films for Kokuei, the oldest pink film company, Japan's first 3-D film, the world's first 3-D sex film, and Japan's first "invisible man" pink film.

Life and career

Early life
Seki was born on September 20, 1911, near Kaminarimon in the Asakusa neighborhood of Tokyo, Japan. His father was in the construction business. After graduating from high school in 1930, Seki attended the Tokyo School of Fine Arts (merged into Tokyo University of the Arts in 1949), dropping out after one year. In 1937 he joined his father in working in the prop department of Ōizumi Films, a studio which was purchased by Toei Company in 1951. He eventually became Deputy Director for large props at the studio. He moved to Beijing where he worked with the North China Electric Co. before he was drafted into the army.

Returning to Japan after the war, Seki joined ). His career as a director began here, where he filmed children's television documentaries focusing on nature and animals.

Pink film career
Kokuei, currently the oldest existing pink film studio, was founded in 1955 by Teruo Yamoto. The company began concentrating on sex films—imported films and filmed strip shows—in 1957. With the advent of the pink film genre in 1962, the studio decided to make a series of films which would exploit the nudity now possible in theatrical features by featuring semi-nude actresses in natural settings. With Seki's experience in nature and animal photography, he was hired as the director of these "Female Tarzan" films, the studio's first films in the pink genre. Seki's directorial debut was with  filmed in 1962—the year of Satoru Kobayashi's Flesh Market, the first film in the pink genre—and released in 1963. Through Valley of Lust, Seki was indirectly responsible for the name pinku eiga applied to Japanese theatrical softcore films. The films were called  during most of the 1960s. In a review of Valley of Lust in the sports paper Naigai Times, writer Minoru Murai suggested that the genre should have a "Pink Ribbon Award" as an equivalent of the mainstream "Blue Ribbon" award given to films by the paper. The color pink was meant to suggest the blushing that the films induced in viewers. Seki filmed a sequel the year of the first film's release,  (1963).

In 1964, Seki directed writer Oniroku Dan's sister, Miyoko Kuroiwa, in the pink film . Kuroizawa was best known as a jazz singer. He also became associated with Noriko Tatsumi, who is considered the first Queen of Japanese sex films. He directed Tatsumi in some of her best-known films, including Whore (1967) and Erotic Culture Shock: Swapping Partners (1969). Seki's 1967 film  was Japan's first 3-D film, and, according to Allmovie, the world's first 3-D sex film. A story of a policeman's hunt for a rapist-murderer, this predominantly black & white film emphasizes the murders with color in addition to the 3-D. Comparing it to the later U.S. 3-D sexploitation film The Stewardesses (1969), Allmovie calls Hentaima "an altogether more gruesome affair featuring brutal rape, murder, and necrophilia." Seki remade the film as 
Abnormal Sex Crimes (Ijō sei hanzai, 1969). Seki's 1968 film,  was the first pink film with an "invisible man" theme. The film has a military doctor who discovers how to make himself invisible. He uses this ability to peek on bathing women, and to execute robberies. The film inspired three sequels.

Partial filmography

Bibliography

English

Japanese

Notes

1911 births
Year of death missing
Japanese film directors
Pink film directors